RuPaul's Drag Race: Untucked! (often shortened to Untucked!)  is a spin-off of the American reality competition RuPaul's Drag Race, currently airing on the cable channel VH1. The program debuted on Logo in the United States on February 1, 2010, as a companion show launched in conjunction with the second season of RuPaul's Drag Race; it moved to WOWPresents on March 3, 2015, as a web series, coinciding with the debut of the seventh season of the parent series. The series returned to cable television, now on VH1, on March 22, 2018, coinciding with the tenth season of RuPaul's Drag Race.

It has been nominated for nine Emmy Awards: five for Outstanding Unstructured Reality Program (one win), and four for Outstanding Picture Editing for an Unstructured Reality Program.

Format 
The first season of Drag Race was accompanied by a seven-episode web series, titled Under the Hood of RuPaul's Drag Race. LOGOonline published a webisode of Under the Hood after each episode of Drag Race. In this companion series, RuPaul presents a documentary of contestants' conversation in the green room, replays pertinent moments from Drag Race, and airs deleted footage.

In the second season of Drag Race in 2010, Logo reformatted Under the Hood, increased its production budget, moved it from the web to television, and re-titled it to RuPaul's Drag Race: Untucked. Logo broadcast an episode of Untucked after each episode of Drag Race. Untucked replaces the basic green room of Under the Hood with two decorated rooms that were until season six sponsored by Absolut Vodka and Interior Illusions, Inc.: the Interior Illusions Lounge and the Gold Bar. FormDecor sponsored the Lounge for season six. These two backstage areas allow for separate group conversations.

At the start of the seventh season of the Drag Race, Untucked reverted to a web series, as part of the World of Wonder YouTube page. Instead of two decorated rooms, Untucked was moved back to one room, an empty backstage space that connects to the main stage and work room, with couches for contestants to chat on. The newly renovated version also follows contestants following their elimination from the show, documenting them packing their belongings and leaving the set. The web series format continued for the eighth and ninth seasons. For the show's tenth season, Untucked returned to television, where it airs on VH1 during the 30-minute time slot after the 90-minute episode airs. For the Untucked's thirteenth season, the show was filmed in the newly expanded work room in accordance with COVID-19 protocols.

Adaptations

RuPaul's Drag Race All Stars: Untucked! 
The first season of RuPaul's Drag Race All Stars featured an Untucked! aftershow, similar to regular seasons. Starting with the second season of All Stars, the format required contestants to be eliminated by the top queen and meant judges' deliberations while contestants untucked were unnecessary. The fifth season of All Stars saw the return of Untucked! alongside a new elimination format.

Drag Race Philippines: Untucked! 
After the teaser trailer for Drag Race Philippines was released, it also announced an Untucked! aftershow, a companion series based on the American show. The companion series showcases the contestants’ conversations, key moments, and deleted footage in a similar documentary format. The behind-the-scenes series began to premiere on August 19, 2022, two days after the main show's premiere.

Drag Race Sverige: Untucked! 
On October 19, 2022, it was confirmed that the Sweden adaptation will have its own companion series called Drag Race Sverige: Untucked! This marks the fourth iteration of the Untucked! aftershow. The Swedish aftershow is premiere the same day as the main show, which is March 4, 2023.

Series overview

Awards and nomination

Ratings
With the aftershow moving onto MTV, the two-episode premiere from the fourthteenth season of RuPaul's Drag Race: Untucked! it attracted respectively 343,000 (0.11) and 230,000 (0.07) total viewers.

References

RuPaul's Drag Race
Logo TV original programming
YouTube original programming
VH1 original programming
2000s American reality television series
2010s American reality television series
2020s American reality television series
2000s American LGBT-related television series
2010s American LGBT-related television series
2020s American LGBT-related television series
American LGBT-related reality television series
American LGBT-related web series
American television spin-offs
Reality television spin-offs
Television series by World of Wonder (company)
2010s LGBT-related reality television series
2020s LGBT-related reality television series
Paramount+ original programming